Tsamaya Moratuoa is a 1980 album by the Mahotella Queens. The album was one of the first to feature a more modern form of mbaqanga, implementing a 1980s drum backing with solid drumsticks (and not with brushes, as had been the case in the 1960s and part of the 1970s). The album featured songs such as "Tsamaya Moratuoa," "Mpulele," "Re Basadi Kaofela" and the Sotho-traditional hymn "Seteng Sediba" (which was covered by the Soweto Gospel Choir in 2006).

Track listing
 "Tsamaya Moratuoa"
 "Tshoara Khaitsedi"
 "Mokgadi O Fihlile"
 "Ke Utloile"
 "Mmina Tau"
 "Mpulele"
 "Re Basadi Kaofela"
 "Maqaqailana"
 "Maile"
 "Tsoela Fela Ngoanana"
 "Ha Bo Tle"
 "Seteng Sediba"

Personnel
Mahotella Queens
 Emily Zwane
 Hazel Zwane
 Caroline Kapentar
 Irene Mawela
 Thandi Nkosi
Producer: Marks Mankwane
Engineer: Greg Cutler/Phil Audoire
Published by Mavuthela Music Co.
Gallo Record Company

Mahlathini and the Mahotella Queens albums
1980 albums